Paraya Ghar  is a 1989 Bollywood film directed by Kalpataru and starring Rishi Kapoor, Jaya Prada, Raj Babbar, Aruna Irani, Madhavi, Sachin Pilgaonkar, Tanuja and Kader Khan.

Soundtrack
Music is composed by Laxmikant–Pyarelal, while the songs are written by Hasan Kamal.

References

External links
 

1980s Hindi-language films
1989 films
Films directed by Kalpataru